War Art with Eddie Redmayne is a documentary film, written and directed by Margy Kinmonth. Produced by Foxtrot Films Ltd, it was made as part of the ITV’s Perspectives (TV series) strand. Eddie Redmayne stars in this documentary which speaks on historical and contemporary war art. Redmayne received a degree in Art History from Cambridge University.

Credits 
 Contributors
 Eddie Redmayne
 George Butler
 Graeme Lothian
 Julia Midgley
 Peter Howson
 Alexandra Milton

References 

2015 television films
2015 films
British documentary films
2010s British films